= Alpha-factor-transporting ATPase =

Class of enzymes

Identifiers
- EC no.: 3.6.3.48

Databases
- IntEnz: IntEnz view
- BRENDA: BRENDA entry
- ExPASy: NiceZyme view
- KEGG: KEGG entry
- MetaCyc: metabolic pathway
- PRIAM: profile
- PDB structures: RCSB PDB PDBe PDBsum
Search
- PMC: articles
- PubMed: articles
- NCBI: proteins

In enzymology, an alpha-factor-transporting ATPase (EC 3.6.3.48) is an enzyme that catalyzes the chemical reaction

ATP + H_{2}O + alpha-factorin $\rightleftharpoons$ ADP + phosphate + alpha-factorout

The 3 substrates of this enzyme are ATP, H_{2}O, and alpha-factor, whereas its 3 products are ADP, phosphate, and alpha-factor.

This enzyme belongs to the family of hydrolases, specifically those acting on acid anhydrides to catalyse transmembrane movement of substances. The systematic name of this enzyme class is ATP phosphohydrolase (alpha-factor-transporting).
